Big Mosque may refer to:

 Big Mosque, Poonamallee, Chennai, Tamil Nadu, India
 Kazimar Big Mosque, Madurai, Tamil Nadu, India
 Triplicane Big Mosque, Chennai, Tamil Nadu, India